Boris Tropaneț (11 October 1964 – 22 May 2008) was a Moldovan professional football coach and a player of Ukrainian descent.

Career
He made his professional debut in the Soviet Top League in 1984 for FC Chornomorets Odessa. He played 4 games in the UEFA Intertoto Cup 1996 for FC KAMAZ-Chally Naberezhnye Chelny.

Legacy
A stadium was named in his honor in the village of Zorya, where played in local club FC Balkany Zorya.

References

External links
 

1964 births
2008 deaths
Ukrainian emigrants to Moldova
Soviet footballers
Moldovan footballers
Moldovan expatriate footballers
Association football midfielders
Expatriate footballers in Poland
Expatriate footballers in Russia
Expatriate footballers in South Korea
Expatriate footballers in Indonesia
Moldovan football managers
Russian Premier League players
FC Chornomorets Odesa players
FC CSKA Kyiv players
MFC Mykolaiv players
SC Tavriya Simferopol players
FC Zimbru Chișinău players
Polonia Bytom players
FC KAMAZ Naberezhnye Chelny players
FC Sokol Saratov players
Jeju United FC players
K League 1 players
CSF Bălți players
FC Zimbru Chișinău managers
Sportspeople from Odesa Oblast